George Lee Altman (born March 20, 1933) is an American former professional baseball outfielder who had a lengthy career in both Major League Baseball and Nippon Professional Baseball. A three-time National League All-Star, he appeared in 991 games over nine full seasons in the major leagues. Then, at age 35, he began an eight-year tenure in Japanese baseball, where he would hit 205 home runs and bat .309 with 985 hits.

He was born in Goldsboro, North Carolina, and graduated from Tennessee State University, an historically black college in Nashville, where he played varsity baseball and basketball.

Baseball career

In North America
Altman's first professional baseball experience came with the Kansas City Monarchs of the Negro leagues; he played three months for the team in 1955. He then was signed by the Chicago Cubs, on the recommendation of the legendary Buck O'Neil. He made the Cubs' roster in  after two years in the minor leagues and two in the United States Army. He started 102 games in center field, including on Opening Day, when he went two for three against Don Drysdale in a 6–1 Chicago victory.

But he improved his batting average to .266, and in  he claimed the Cubs' starting right field job, batted .303 in 138 games, smashed 27 home runs, and led the National League in triples with 12. In his first All-Star at bat, during that season's first midsummer classic (MLB played two such games from 1959 through 1962) at Candlestick Park on July 11, Altman hit a pinch hit home run off Mike Fornieles in the eighth inning; the National League ultimately prevailed in the wind-blown contest, 5–4.

Once again making the All-Star team, Altman set personal bests in games played (147), hits (170), batting average (.318) and stolen bases (19); he also slugged 22 homers. Altman was sixth in the league in stolen bases and fourth in on-base percentage. But the Cubs suffered through an embarrassing, ninth-place season, and in the 1962–1963 offseason, Altman became a major piece in a six-player trade with the St. Louis Cardinals that brought pitchers Larry Jackson and Lindy McDaniel to Chicago.

He became the  Cardinals' starting right fielder and played a role in a pennant race that saw the Redbirds challenge the eventual world champion Los Angeles Dodgers into late September before a six-game losing streak doomed their chances. But Altman's production declined, as he was platooned and started only against right-handed pitching; his average fell 44 points to .274, and he hit only nine home runs. Again, he was traded in the off-season, sent to the last-place New York Mets for pitcher Roger Craig in November. Altman played four more years in the majors. But he struggled offensively, hitting .230 in 124 games, again hitting only nine homers, and was traded back to the Cubs in January 1965.

In Japan
It served him well the following season, when he began his career in Japanese baseball. He played from  through  for the Lotte Orions and the Hanshin Tigers, and enjoyed seasons of 39, 34 and 30 homers—and four more years with 20 or more blasts—and batted over .300 six times. Highlights from his NPB career included leading the Pacific League in hits (170), runs (84), and RBI (100) in 1968; and being named to the "Best Nine" Pacific League team in 1968, 1970, and 1971. He credited martial arts training for baseball success in Japan.

MLB totals
In his nine-year major league career with the Cubs, Cardinals and Mets, Altman batted .269; his 832 hits included 132 doubles, 34 triples, and 101 home runs. He had 403 RBIs in 991 games played. He recorded a .981 fielding percentage playing at all three outfield positions and first base. In three All-Star Game appearances, his 1961 homer was his only hit in three at bats; he played errorless ball in the field over three innings as the National League's right fielder in 1961's second midsummer classic, played July 31 at Fenway Park.

Altman currently resides in O'Fallon, Missouri.

See also
 List of Major League Baseball annual triples leaders

References

External links

1933 births
Living people
African-American baseball players
American expatriate baseball players in Japan
American men's basketball players
Baseball players from North Carolina
Burlington Bees players
Chicago Cubs players
Cienfuegos players
Hanshin Tigers players
Kansas City Monarchs players
Lotte Orions players
Major League Baseball outfielders
National League All-Stars
New York Mets players
Nippon Professional Baseball outfielders
People from Goldsboro, North Carolina
People from O'Fallon, Missouri
Pueblo Bruins players
St. Louis Cardinals players
Tacoma Cubs players
Tennessee State Tigers baseball players
Tennessee State Tigers basketball players
Tokyo Orions players
American expatriate baseball players in Panama
American expatriate baseball players in Cuba
21st-century African-American people